10 Years of Hits – Newly Recorded is the twelfth studio album by American country music artist Vern Gosdin. It was released in 1990 via Columbia Records. The album peaked at number 21 on the Billboard Top Country Albums chart.

Track listing

Personnel
 Mark Casstevens - acoustic guitar
 Carol Chase - background vocals
 Linda Davis - background vocals
 Vern Gosdin - lead vocals, background vocals
 Jerry Kroon - drums
 Brent Mason - electric guitar
 Tim Mensy - electric guitar
 Ron Oates - keyboards
 Billy Sanford - electric guitar
 Lisa Silver - background vocals
 Ricky Skaggs - background vocals
 Jim Vest - steel guitar
 Bergen White - background vocals
 Dennis Wilson - background vocals
 Lonnie Wilson - drums
 Bob Wray - bass guitar

Charts

Weekly charts

Year-end charts

Certifications

References

1990 albums
Vern Gosdin albums
Columbia Records albums
Albums produced by Bob Montgomery (songwriter)